Nekemte, also spelled as Neqemte (Amharic: ነቀምት), is a market town and separate woreda in western Ethiopia.

Nekemte was the capital of the former East welega, and is home to a museum of Machaa Oromo culture. It is a burial place of Onesimos Nesib, a famous Oromo who translated the Bible to Oromo Language for the first time, in collaboration with Aster Ganno. It is also the seat of an Apostolic Vicariate of the Roman Catholic Church. Nekemte is host city to the newly built Wollega University as of 2007. It is served by an airport that is not currently open to commercial flights.

Nekemte is at the center of the road network for south-western Ethiopia. The first major road dates to the early 1930s, with a road that extended from the capital Addis Ababa west through Addis Alem, although the road was passable only by lorries for the 255 kilometers between Addis Alem and Nekemte. Pankhurst later notes in his book that this road had five toll-gates. A road connecting Nekemte to Gimbi, 110 kilometers in length, was part of the first stage of the Third Highway Program in 1963. Postal service for this city has been present as early as 1923. A branch of the Ethiopian Electric Light and Power Authority began providing electricity to the city by 1960. By 1957, phone service extended to the city.

History 
Nekemte like most of the towns of the Welega Province grew as a result of the rise of agricultural surplus after the Oromo became permanently settled in the early in the late 16th-century. Its rise was also closely connected with the rise of the Oromo institution of Gadaa, a system where every 8 years leadership in the community was transferred to a new age class of leaders.

Nekemte was formerly overshadowed by nearby Lieka and Bilo, the former regional markets. Nekemte acquired some importance when Bekere Godana in 1841 extended his rule of Nekemte over more area to form a new polity. and later his son Moroda Bekere made it the capital of their kingdom of Welega in the mid-19th century. Under Mereda's son Kumsa Moroda (Gebregziabher Moroda after converting to Christianity), the town continued in its importance as it submitted to Shewan rule. The Russian explorer Alexander Bulatovich visited Nekemte 13 March 1897; in memoirs he describes its marketplace as "a very lively place and presents a motley mixture of languages, dress, and peoples", and carefully described the paintings in the town's newly constructed Ethiopian Orthodox church. In 1905, a central government customs office was officially opened in Nekemte. Construction on a hospital began in 1927, and was completed in 1932 with Swedish funds as well as contributions from Ras Tafari (who later became Emperor Haile Selassie). It formally opened 16 February 1932, although it had already been in operation for eight months.

The artist Daniel Twafe was born in 1934 in or near Nekemte. He studied in the United States in 1955-1957 and in Paris in 1971. He made more sculptures than paintings and became employed at the National Museum in Addis Ababa. Another from in this area was Mamo Tessema, who was born in 1935. He was trained at the Handicraft School in the school and went to the US for higher studies in 1958. He designed ceramics and also wrote some publications.

By 1935 Nekemte had become the most important town in Welega. There were nearly 70 foreign residents before the Italian occupation, mostly merchants and missionaries. 23 importers-exporters had agencies there, most of whom were Indians, but these also included two Greeks, a Lebanese, and an Armenian. The British explorer Dunlop, who spent four days of the same year in that town, noted that its central location on the main trade route between Addis Ababa and the Anglo-Sudan led to it having "developed enormously during the preceding few years, as the new school, warehouses, stores, and hospital testified".

During the Italian invasion, Nekemte was bombed by the Italians 5 July 1936; this included dropping 19 bombs on the recently constructed school complex of the local Swedish mission. Dejazmach Habte Maryam, governor of Welega, accepted the Italians and received Colonel A. Marone who arrived by air on 14 October and the troops of Colonel Malta who reached the town on 24 October, after having marched by foot and mule for twelve days from Addis Alem, which weakened Ras Imru Haile Selassie's attempts as Prince Regent to establish a center of resistance at Gore. After his successful return to Ethiopia, on 20 May 1941 Emperor Haile Selassie visited Welega where fighting still continued and where Kebede Tesemma was in charge of the Arbegnoch. When he attempted to visit Nekemte, his party came under artillery fire.

A public address system was installed in the central square in Nekemte (and in ten other towns) in 1955, used for receiving transmission from Radio Addis Ababa and re-broadcasting it. In 1957 Haile Sellasie I School was opened, one of nine provincial secondary schools in Ethiopia and outside Eritrea. At that time Nekemte was still the end point of the telephone line westward. The Tafari Makonnen Leprosarium (founded that year) also had a home-school for children of leprous parents.

Head of State Mengistu Haile Mariam visited Nekemte during a formal tour in March–May 1979. In that same year, over 300 Evangelical Christians had been imprisoned for political reasons.

Early in 1991, the Ethiopian Fourth Revolutionary Army had its headquarters at Nekemte. The Ethiopian People's Revolutionary Democratic Front captured Nekemte on 2 April 1991, as part of Operation Freedom and Equality (Duula Bilisummaa fi Walqixxummaa). In response, the Oromo Liberation Front (OLF) said in a broadcast on the Radio Voice of Oromo Liberation (Frankfurt am Main) on 15 April 1991: "The OLF strongly opposes the phrase: liberating Wellega or the Oromo nation. It is false for any alien force to say that it will liberate the Oromo nation."

After the Ethiopian trade mission in the Somaliland city of Hargeisa was hit by a suicide bomb attack, which killed at least four Ethiopian civilian lives on 29 October 2008, three human rights activists working for the Ethiopian Human Rights Council in Nekemte were arrested, but were released by 27 November.

Climate 
The city has a mil highland subtropical climate (Köppen: Cwb). With a lower elevation than Adis Ababa, Nekemte has a slightly higher average temperature, differing mainly in the low averages. The average annual temperature is 18.3 °C (high: 24 °C and low: 12.6 °C), although to the north of Equator March is the warmest month and July the coldest month. It has one of the highest rainfall in Ethiopia in a short time. With more than 2080 mm, it is one of the rainiest places in the country. Nekemte is on an imaginary line where the western winds give places to the orient winds. It is one of the seven rainiest cities in the country. Recently in the last decade the annual average temperature of single meteorological station had a reduction of the average annual temperature to the value of the beginning of the decade of 1990, but are still higher than since the beginning of the record: around the year of 1970. The last few years of record had a greater precipitate at the same time as during a period of the 1980s there was one of the most sealed years of record history.

Education 
 Africa Beza College
 Wollega University
 New Generation University College
 Rift valley University 
 Nekemte Technical and Vocational
  Dandii Boru College 
 [kiyamed university college]]
 Harbar University College

Demographics 
The 2007 national census reported a total population for this woreda of 75,219, of whom 38,385 were men and 36,834 were women. The majority of the inhabitants were Protestant, with 48.49% of the population reporting they observed this belief, while 39.33% of the population said they observed Ethiopian Orthodox Christianity, and 10.88% were Moslem.

The 1994 census reported this town had a total population of 47,258 of whom 22,844 were males and 24,414 were females. Nekemte is the largest city in Guto Wayu woreda.

Sports 

Association football is the main sport in Nekemte. The Welega Stadium, which has a capacity of 50,000, is the largest sports venue by capacity in Nekemte. It opened in 2019 and the stadium is also mainly used for football, and also for athletics.

See also 

 List of cities and towns in Ethiopia

References

Sources

Further reading 
 

Populated places in the Oromia Region
Ethiopia
Cities and towns in Ethiopia